Engano River may refer to either of two rivers of Santa Catarina state in southeastern Brazil:

Engano River (Itajaí River)
Engano River (Uruguay River)

Other
Do Engano River

See also
Cape Engaño (disambiguation)